Olingechiton is an extinct genus of polyplacophoran molluscs. Olingechiton became extinct at the end of the Cretaceous period.

References 

Prehistoric chiton genera